This is a list of butterflies of Botswana. About 252 species are known from Botswana, none of which are endemic.

Papilionidae

Papilioninae

Papilionini
Papilio nireus lyaeus Doubleday, 1845
Papilio dardanus cenea Stoll, 1790
Papilio constantinus Ward, 1871
Papilio demodocus Esper, [1798]

Leptocercini
Graphium antheus (Cramer, 1779)
Graphium porthaon (Hewitson, 1865)
Graphium angolanus (Goeze, 1779)
Graphium morania (Angas, 1849)
Graphium leonidas (Fabricius, 1793)

Pieridae

Coliadinae
Eurema brigitta (Stoll, [1780])
Eurema hapale (Mabille, 1882)
Eurema hecabe solifera (Butler, 1875)
Catopsilia florella (Fabricius, 1775)
Colias electo (Linnaeus, 1763)

Pierinae
Colotis amata calais (Cramer, 1775)
Colotis antevippe gavisa (Wallengren, 1857)
Colotis auxo (Lucas, 1852)
Colotis celimene amina (Hewitson, 1866)
Colotis celimene pholoe (Wallengren, 1860)
Colotis danae annae (Wallengren, 1857)
Colotis dissociatus (Butler, 1897)
Colotis euippe omphale (Godart, 1819)
Colotis evagore antigone (Boisduval, 1836)
Colotis evenina (Wallengren, 1857)
Colotis ione (Godart, 1819)
Colotis lais (Butler, 1876)
Colotis pallene (Hopffer, 1855)
Colotis regina (Trimen, 1863)
Colotis vesta mutans (Butler, 1877)
Colotis eris (Klug, 1829)
Colotis subfasciatus (Swainson, 1833)
Colotis agoye agoye (Wallengren, 1857)
Colotis agoye bowkeri (Trimen, 1883)
Eronia cleodora Hübner, 1823
Eronia leda (Boisduval, 1847)
Pinacopterix eriphia (Godart, [1819])
Nepheronia buquetii (Boisduval, 1836)
Nepheronia thalassina (Suffert, 1904)

Pierini
Appias epaphia contracta (Butler, 1888)
Pontia helice (Linnaeus, 1764)
Mylothris agathina (Cramer, 1779)
Mylothris rubricosta attenuata Talbot, 1944
Mylothris rueppellii haemus (Trimen, 1879)
Belenois aurota (Fabricius, 1793)
Belenois creona severina (Stoll, 1781)
Belenois gidica abyssinica (Lucas, 1852)

Lycaenidae

Miletinae

Miletini
Spalgis lemolea Druce, 1890
Lachnocnema bibulus (Fabricius, 1793)
Lachnocnema durbani Trimen & Bowker, 1887
Thestor basutus capeneri Dickson, 1972

Poritiinae

Liptenini
Alaena amazoula ochroma Vári, 1976
Baliochila singularis Stempffer and Bennett, 1953
Cnodontes pallida (Trimen, 1898)
Cnodontes penningtoni Bennett, 1954

Aphnaeinae
Chloroselas mazoensis (Trimen, 1898)
Crudaria leroma (Wallengren, 1857)
Trimenia wykehami (Dickson, 1969)
Cigaritis ella (Hewitson, 1865)
Cigaritis natalensis (Westwood, 1851)
Cigaritis phanes (Trimen, 1873)
Zeritis sorhagenii (Dewitz, 1879)
Axiocerses tjoane (Wallengren, 1857)
Axiocerses amanga (Westwood, 1881)
Aloeides trimeni Tite & Dickson, 1973
Aloeides damarensis (Trimen, 1891)
Aloeides molomo krooni Tite & Dickson, 1973
Aloeides taikosama (Wallengren, 1857)
Aloeides simplex (Trimen, 1893)
Aphnaeus hutchinsonii Trimen & Bowker, 1887
Tylopaedia sardonyx (Trimen, 1868)

Theclinae
Myrina silenus ficedula Trimen, 1879
Hypolycaena philippus (Fabricius, 1793)
Hemiolaus caeculus caeculus (Hopffer, 1855)
Hemiolaus caeculus tsodiloensis (Pinhey, 1969)
Leptomyrina hirundo (Wallengren, 1857)
Leptomyrina henningi Dickson, 1976
Iolaus mimosae rhodosense (Stempffer & Bennett, 1959)
Iolaus nasisii (Riley, 1928)
Iolaus penningtoni (Stempffer & Bennett, 1959)
Iolaus pallene (Wallengren, 1857)
Iolaus trimeni Wallengren, 1875
Iolaus silarus Druce, 1885
Stugeta bowkeri tearei Dickson, 1980
Stugeta subinfuscata Grünberg, 1910
Deudorix antalus (Hopffer, 1855)
Deudorix dinochares Grose-Smith, 1887

Polyommatinae

Lycaenesthini
Anthene amarah (Guérin-Méneville, 1849)
Anthene butleri livida (Trimen, 1881)
Anthene contrastata mashuna (Stevenson, 1937)
Anthene lunulata (Trimen, 1894)
Anthene millari (Trimen, 1893)
Anthene minima (Trimen, 1893)
Anthene princeps (Butler, 1876)
Anthene talboti Stempffer, 1936

Polyommatini
Cupidopsis cissus (Godart, [1824])
Cupidopsis jobates (Hopffer, 1855)
Pseudonacaduba sichela (Wallengren, 1857)
Lampides boeticus (Linnaeus, 1767)
Cacyreus lingeus (Stoll, 1782)
Cacyreus marshalli Butler, 1898
Cacyreus virilis Stempffer, 1936
Harpendyreus notoba (Trimen, 1868)
Leptotes brevidentatus (Tite, 1958)
Leptotes pirithous (Linnaeus, 1767)
Leptotes pulchra (Murray, 1874)
Tuxentius calice (Hopffer, 1855)
Tuxentius melaena (Trimen & Bowker, 1887)
Tarucus sybaris linearis (Aurivillius, 1924)
Zintha hintza (Trimen, 1864)
Zizeeria knysna (Trimen, 1862)
Actizera lucida (Trimen, 1883)
Zizula hylax (Fabricius, 1775)
Brephidium metophis (Wallengren, 1860)
Oraidium barberae (Trimen, 1868)
Azanus jesous (Guérin-Méneville, 1849)
Azanus mirza (Plötz, 1880)
Azanus moriqua (Wallengren, 1857)
Azanus ubaldus (Stoll, 1782)
Eicochrysops hippocrates (Fabricius, 1793)
Eicochrysops messapus mahallakoaena (Wallengren, 1857)
Euchrysops dolorosa (Trimen & Bowker, 1887)
Euchrysops malathana (Boisduval, 1833)
Euchrysops osiris (Hopffer, 1855)
Euchrysops subpallida Bethune-Baker, 1923
Freyeria trochylus (Freyer, [1843])
Lepidochrysops chloauges (Bethune-Baker, [1923])
Lepidochrysops glauca (Trimen & Bowker, 1887)
Lepidochrysops longifalces Tite, 1961
Lepidochrysops patricia (Trimen & Bowker, 1887)
Lepidochrysops plebeia (Butler, 1898)
Lepidochrysops rossouwi Henning & Henning, 1994
Lepidochrysops vansoni (Swanepoel, 1949)

Nymphalidae

Libytheinae
Libythea labdaca laius Trimen, 1879

Danainae

Danaini
Danaus chrysippus orientis (Aurivillius, 1909)
Tirumala petiverana (Doubleday, 1847)
Amauris tartarea Mabille, 1876
Amauris echeria lobengula (Sharpe, 1890)

Satyrinae

Melanitini
Melanitis leda (Linnaeus, 1758)

Satyrini
Bicyclus anynana (Butler, 1879)
Bicyclus ena (Hewitson, 1877)
Heteropsis simonsii (Butler, 1877)
Ypthima antennata (van Son, 1955)
Ypthima asterope (Klug, 1832)
Ypthima granulosa (Butler, 1883)
Ypthima impura paupera (Ungemach, 1932)
Ypthimomorpha itonia (Hewitson, 1865)
Coenyropsis natalii (Boisduval, 1847)
Physcaeneura panda (Boisduval, 1847)

Charaxinae

Charaxini
Charaxes varanes vologeses (Mabille, 1876)
Charaxes candiope (Godart, 1824)
Charaxes jasius saturnus Butler, 1866
Charaxes brutus natalensis Staudinger, 1885
Charaxes bohemani Felder & Felder, 1859
Charaxes achaemenes Felder & Felder, 1867
Charaxes jahlusa argynnides Westwood, 1864
Charaxes jahlusa rex Henning, 1978
Charaxes phaeus Hewitson, 1877
Charaxes vansoni van Someren, 1975
Charaxes brainei van Son, 1966
Charaxes guderiana (Dewitz, 1879)
Charaxes zoolina (Westwood, [1850])

Nymphalinae

Nymphalini
Vanessa cardui (Linnaeus, 1758)
Junonia hierta cebrene Trimen, 1870
Junonia natalica (Felder & Felder, 1860)
Junonia oenone (Linnaeus, 1758)
Junonia orithya madagascariensis Guenée, 1865
Protogoniomorpha anacardii nebulosa (Trimen, 1881)
Precis antilope (Feisthamel, 1850)
Precis archesia (Cramer, 1779)
Precis ceryne (Boisduval, 1847)
Precis octavia sesamus Trimen, 1883
Hypolimnas misippus (Linnaeus, 1764)
Catacroptera cloanthe (Stoll, 1781)

Biblidinae

Biblidini
Byblia anvatara acheloia (Wallengren, 1857)
Byblia ilithyia (Drury, 1773)
Eurytela dryope angulata Aurivillius, 1899

Epicaliini
Sevenia amulia intermedia (Carcasson, 1961)
Sevenia rosa (Hewitson, 1877)

Limenitinae

Limenitidini
Pseudacraea boisduvalii trimenii Butler, 1874
Pseudacraea lucretia expansa (Butler, 1878)

Neptidini
Neptis alta Overlaet, 1955
Neptis jordani Neave, 1910
Neptis laeta Overlaet, 1955
Neptis serena Overlaet, 1955

Adoliadini
Hamanumida daedalus (Fabricius, 1775)

Heliconiinae

Acraeini
Acraea acara Hewitson, 1865
Acraea anemosa Hewitson, 1865
Acraea barberi Trimen, 1881
Acraea neobule Doubleday, 1847
Acraea trimeni Aurivillius, 1899
Acraea acrita ambigua Trimen, 1891
Acraea atolmis Westwood, 1881
Acraea nohara Boisduval, 1847
Acraea aglaonice Westwood, 1881
Acraea atergatis Westwood, 1881
Acraea axina Westwood, 1881
Acraea caldarena Hewitson, 1877
Acraea lygus Druce, 1875
Acraea natalica Boisduval, 1847
Acraea oncaea Hopffer, 1855
Acraea stenobea Wallengren, 1860
Acraea acerata Hewitson, 1874
Acraea encedon (Linnaeus, 1758)
Acraea serena (Fabricius, 1775)
Acraea burni Butler, 1896
Acraea rahira Boisduval, 1833

Vagrantini
Phalanta phalantha aethiopica (Rothschild & Jordan, 1903)

Hesperiidae

Coeliadinae
Coeliades forestan (Stoll, [1782])
Coeliades libeon (Druce, 1875)
Coeliades pisistratus (Fabricius, 1793)

Pyrginae

Celaenorrhinini
Sarangesa lucidella (Mabille, 1891)
Sarangesa motozi (Wallengren, 1857)
Sarangesa phidyle (Walker, 1870)
Sarangesa seineri (Strand, 1909)

Tagiadini
Tagiades flesus (Fabricius, 1781)
Calleagris jamesoni (Sharpe, 1890)
Caprona pillaana Wallengren, 1857
Leucochitonea levubu Wallengren, 1857
Abantis paradisea (Butler, 1870)
Abantis tettensis Hopffer, 1855

Carcharodini
Spialia agylla (Trimen & Bowker, 1889)
Spialia colotes transvaaliae (Trimen & Bowker, 1889)
Spialia delagoae (Trimen, 1898)
Spialia depauperata australis de Jong, 1978
Spialia diomus ferax (Wallengren, 1863)
Spialia dromus (Plötz, 1884)
Spialia mafa (Trimen, 1870)
Spialia paula (Higgins, 1924)
Spialia secessus (Trimen, 1891)
Spialia spio (Linnaeus, 1764)
Gomalia elma (Trimen, 1862)

Hesperiinae

Aeromachini
Kedestes callicles (Hewitson, 1868)
Kedestes lepenula (Wallengren, 1857)
Teniorhinus harona (Westwood, 1881)
Acada biseriata (Mabille, 1893)
Parosmodes morantii (Trimen, 1873)
Andronymus neander (Plötz, 1884)
Zophopetes dysmephila (Trimen, 1868)
Platylesches ayresii (Trimen & Bowker, 1889)

Baorini
Pelopidas mathias (Fabricius, 1798)
Pelopidas thrax (Hübner, 1821)
Borbo borbonica (Boisduval, 1833)
Borbo fallax (Gaede, 1916)
Borbo fanta (Evans, 1937)
Borbo fatuellus (Hopffer, 1855)
Borbo gemella (Mabille, 1884)
Borbo micans (Holland, 1896)
Parnara monasi (Trimen & Bowker, 1889)
Gegenes hottentota (Latreille, 1824)
Gegenes niso (Linnaeus, 1764)
Gegenes pumilio gambica (Mabille, 1878)

Heteropterinae
Metisella willemi (Wallengren, 1857)

See also
Geography of Botswana

References

Seitz, A. Die Gross-Schmetterlinge der Erde 13: Die Afrikanischen Tagfalter. Plates
Seitz, A. Die Gross-Schmetterlinge der Erde 13: Die Afrikanischen Tagfalter. Text (in German)

Butt
Botswana
Botswana
Botswana
Butterflies